The Millewa Football League is an Australian rules football league with teams based in north-western Victoria and south-western New South Wales, Australia.

The clubs are mostly based within the same area as the clubs in the Sunraysia Football League, but generally represent smaller towns and communities. Clubs only field one senior football team and up to five netball teams.

History 
The Millewa Football Association was reformed in 1925. At this time it had teams representing Lock 9, Lake Cullulleraine and Werrimull, and a team called "the Kangaroos". Lake Cullulleraine were the premiers that year. A fortnight after the grand final, a combined association team played the Mildura Football Club in a charity match.

In 1932, the now Millewa Football League contained teams from Bambill, Karawinna, Meringur, Merinee, Pirlta and Werrimull.

Due to World War II, the league went into recess between 1942 and 1945. Media coverage of this league was non-existent between 1940 and 1960. Regular scores did not start appearing in the press until the mid-1970s. Meringur went into recess prior to the 2012 season due to lack of players attributed to the population decline in the district, however returned in 2013. Euston merged with Robinvale of the Sunraysia Football League before the beginning of the 2015 to play in that competition.

Clubs

Current

Past Clubs
Benetook 1931
Coomealla 1981-1993
Euston 1999-2014 (1 Premiership - 2008)
Karawinna 1926-1936
Karween 1932-1934
Karween-Morkalla 1935-1953 (1 Premiership - 1953)
Karween-Karawinna Tigers 1954-1998 (1 Premiership - 1997)
Merinee 1928-1949 (9 Premierships - 1931-2-3-4, 1936-7, 1940-1, 1946)
Meringur-South Merbein 1988-1995 
Nicholls Point 1975-1977
Pirlta 1929-1932
South Merbein Swans 1960-1987 (1 Premiership - 1969)
Yarrara 1926-1937

General statistics

Leading Goal Kickers

Recent Grand Finals

1960	Meringur	11	13	79	Defeated	Werrimull	4	6	30
1961	Meringur	8	15	63	Defeated	Werrimull	8	4	52
1962	Cardross	11	12	78	Defeated	Meringur	11	9	75
1963	Cardross	10	10	70	Defeated	Meringur	10	9	69
1964	Meringur	13	21	99	Defeated	Bambill	13	3	81
1965	Bambill	8	10	58	Defeated	Meringur	5	10	40
1966	Bambill	14	13	97	Defeated	Cardross	14	4	88
1967	Bambill	9	13	67	Defeated	Meringur	5	15	45
1968	Bambill	12	10	82	Defeated	Werrimull	7	10	52
1969	South Merbein	11	11	77	Defeated	Karween-Karawinna	6	11	47
1970	Bambill	13	8	86	Defeated	Cardross	8	12	60
1971	Bambill	14	15	99	Defeated	Karween-Karawinna	11	12	78
1972	Cardross	17	14	116	Defeated	Werrimull	12	18	90
1973	Werrimull	9	11	65	Defeated	Bambill	7	6	48
1974	Werrimull	17	18	120	Defeated	South Merbein	17	11	113
1975	Werrimull	15	18	108	Defeated	Bambill	14	10	94
1976	Bambill	14	12	96	Defeated	Nangiloc	4	17	41
1977	Werrimull	15	15	105	Defeated	Nangiloc	13	13	91
1978	Nangiloc	19	10	124	Defeated	Meringur	18	9	117
1979	Werrimull	16	22	118	Defeated	Bambill	16	18	114
1980	Bambill	15	12	102	Defeated	Werrimull	11	11	77
1981	Werrimull	19	12	126	Defeated	Alcheringa	12	11	83
1982	Alcheringa	31	21	207	Defeated	Cardross	14	8	92
1983	Alcheringa	27	10	172	Defeated	Bambill	14	10	94
1984	Alcheringa	18	17	125	Defeated	Bambill	15	10	100
1985	Bambill	15	11	101	Defeated	Alcheringa	11	9	75
1986	Bambill	15	8	98	Defeated	Alcheringa	13	10	88
1987	Bambill	26	14	170	Defeated	Alcheringa	15	8	98
1988	Bambill	7	18	60	Defeated	Meringur South Merbein	3	9	27
1989	Nangiloc	17	18	120	Defeated	Alcheringa	13	12	90
1990	Nangiloc	15	15	105	Defeated	Alcheringa	10	13	73
1991	Alcheringa	16	11	107	Defeated	Bambill	9	8	62
1992	Alcheringa	12	7	79	Defeated	Bambill	7	13	55
1993	Nangiloc	13	8	86	Defeated	Bambill	8	17	65
1994	Nangiloc	14	16	100	Defeated	Bambill	12	8	80
1995	Nangiloc	15	16	106	Defeated	Bambill	10	10	70
1996	Bambill	15	19	109	Defeated	Nangiloc	11	11	77
1997	Karween-Karawinna	16	10	106	Defeated	Bambill	14	12	96
1998	Bambill	20	12	132	Defeated	Werrimull	6	9	45
1999	Gol Gol	17	15	117	Defeated	Nangiloc	13	14	92
2000	Bambill	18	19	127	Defeated	Gol Gol	11	10	76
2001	Gol Gol	19	16	130	Defeated	Werrimull	5	8	38
2002	Bambill	24	11	155	Defeated	Euston	5	10	40
2003	Werrimull	19	12	126	Defeated	Gol Gol	18	17	125
2004	Gol Gol	12	12	84	Defeated	Bambill	6	10	46
2005	Gol Gol	20	15	135	Defeated	Meringur	4	8	32
2006	Gol Gol	22	18	150	Defeated	Cardross	1	12	18
2007	Bambill	19	13	127	Defeated	Cardross	4	9	33
2008	Euston	13	10	88	Defeated	Gol Gol	6	12	48
2009   Bambill 13      14      92      Defeated        Gol Gol     11      5       71
2010  Gol Gol 14 15 89 Defeated Bambill 5 18 48
2011 Bambill 24 14 158 Defeated Werrimull 14 5 89
2012 Werrimull 20 23 143 Defeated Gol Gol 4 5 29
2013 Werrimull 18 16 124 Defeated Bambill 13 8 86
2014 Bambill 19 21 135 Defeated 9 8 62
2015 Bambill 16 14 110 Defeated Werrimull 8 13 61
2016 Bambill 11 9 75 Defeated Gol Gol 6 9 45
2017 Nangiloc 9 10 64 Defeated Gol Gol 7 13 55
2018 Nangiloc 11 6 72 Defeated Werrimull 8 9 57
2019 Bambill 10 13 73 Defeated Nangiloc 10 10 70
2020 Season cancelled due to covid
2021 Finals cancelled due to covid
2022 Bambill 16 17 113 Defeated Cardross 7 8 50

Premierships

 1926	Werrimull
 1927	Werrimull
 1928	Werrimull
 1929	Werrimull
 1930	Werrimull
 1931	Merinee
 1932	Merinee
 1933	Merinee
 1934	Merinee
 1935	Bambill
 1936	Merinee
 1937	Merinee
 1938	Bambill
 1939	Bambill
 1940	Merinee
 1941	Merinee
 1942	War 
 1943	War
 1944	War
 1945	War
 1946	Merinee
 1947	Werrimull
 1948	Werrimull
 1949	Bambill
 1950	Meringur
 1951	Werrimull
 1952	Meringur
 1953	Karween
 1954	Werrimull
 1955	Werrimull
 1956	Meringur
 1957	Meringur
 1958	Meringur
 1959	Meringur
 1960	Meringur
 1961	Meringur
 1962	Cardross
 1963	Cardross
 1964	Meringur
 1965	Bambill
 1966	Bambill
 1967	Bambill
 1968	Bambill
 1969	South Merbein
 1970	Bambill
 1971	Bambill
 1972	Cardross
 1973	Werrimull
 1974	Werrimull
 1975	Werrimull
 1976	Bambill
 1977	Werrimull
 1978	Nangiloc
 1979	Werrimull
 1980	Bambill
 1981	Werrimull
 1982	Alcheringa
 1983	Alcheringa
 1984	Alcheringa
 1985	Bambill
 1986	Bambill
 1987	Bambill
 1988	Bambill
 1989	Nangiloc
 1990	Nangiloc
 1991	Alcheringa
 1992	Alcheringa
 1993	Nangiloc
 1994	Nangiloc
 1995	Nangiloc
 1996	Bambill
 1997	Karween Karawinna
 1998	Bambill
 1999	Gol Gol
 2000	Bambill
 2001	Gol Gol
 2002	Bambill
 2003	Werrimull
 2004	Gol Gol
 2005	Gol Gol
 2006	Gol Gol
 2007	Bambill
 2008	Euston
 2009 Bambill
 2010	Gol Gol
 2011	Bambill
 2012 Werrimull
 2013 Werrimull
 2014 Bambill
 2015 Bambill
 2016 Bambill
 2017 Nangiloc 
 2018 Nangiloc 
 2019 Bambill
 2020 (none) 

Notes

2015 Ladder

2016 Ladder

2017 Ladder

2018 Ladder

2019 Ladder

References

External links
 Millewa Football League website

Mallee (Victoria)
Australian rules football competitions in Victoria (Australia)
Australian rules football competitions in New South Wales